Dhulo Chimlo Kuttikar is an Indian politician from Goa. He is a former member of the Goa Legislative Assembly representing the Quepem Assembly constituency from 1972 to 1977. He was a member of the Maharashtrawadi Gomantak Party.

Career
Kuttikar contested in the 1972 Goa, Daman and Diu Legislative Assembly election from the Quepem Assembly constituency on the Maharashtrawadi Gomantak Party ticket and emerged victorious by defeating United Goans (Sequiera Group) candidate, Ganba Desai by a margin of 591 votes. He served for five years from 1972 to 1977. This marked his first and last election participation in his political career.

Kuttikar is also said to have dominated the tribal leadership campaign along with Vasu Paik Gaonkar from Canacona, Kashinath Jalmi from Priol, Mama Cardoz from Margao, Antonio Gaonkar from Raia and Prakash Velip from Quepem constituency as members of the Goa Legislative Assembly during the 1980s.

References

Year of birth unknown
Possibly living people
Indian politicians
Goa, Daman and Diu MLAs 1972–1977
Goan people
Maharashtrawadi Gomantak Party politicians
People from South Goa district